In association football, or soccer, scoring a goal is the only method of scoring. In  National Collegiate Athletic Association (NCAA) Division I soccer, there is no formal award for a golden boot, which indicates the top goalscorer in American college soccer for the season. Despite this, the NCAA keeps record of the season goalscoring leader by season.

From 1959 to 1971, there were no classifications to the NCAA nor its predecessor, the Intercollegiate Soccer Football Association (ISFA). Then, from 1972 to 1973, colleges were classified as either "NCAA University Division (Major College)" or "NCAA College Division (Small College)". Since 1974, the NCAA has been broken down into three divisions.

Below is a list of the NCAA Division I men's soccer season goals leaders since the NCAA sponsored men's soccer in 1959.

Key

List

References

External links 
 NCAA Division I Men's Soccer Record Book

NCAA Division I men's soccer statistical leaders